Robert Henry Widmer (May 17, 1916 – June 20, 2011) was an American aeronautical engineer who specialized in designing aircraft for the military. He spent his career working for  Convair which became General Dynamics, then Lockheed, and then Lockheed Martin. His feisty personality and at times insubordinate attitude at one time led company leaders to strongly consider firing him. However, his brilliance at envisioning and designing desirable aircraft years before there was even a market for them led to his appointment as Vice President for science and engineering for all of General Dynamics.

Born in Hawthorne, New Jersey, Widmer earned degrees from Rensselaer Polytechnic Institute and the California Institute of Technology. He began his career working for the California division of Convair, initially as a designer of marine aircraft. He eventually joined the company's main branch in Fort Worth, Texas, where he notably designed the Convair B-58 Hustler which was the first United States Air Force's bomber capable of Mach 2. He went on to lead the design teams for the General Dynamics F-111 Aardvark and the General Dynamics F-16 Fighting Falcon. In 1983 he was awarded the Reed Aeronautics Award by the American Institute of Aeronautics and Astronautics. The award credited him with leading the design of four major Air Force aircraft, the B-36, B-58, F-111, and F-16, and for "pioneering the eras of supersonic cruise and fly-by-wire computerized flight control".  In 1962, he was awarded the Spirit of St. Louis Medal by the American Society of Mechanical Engineers for his work on the B-58. In 2007, he was inducted into the Rensselaer Alumni Hall of Fame.

Widmer died in Fort Worth, Texas in 2011 at the age of 95.

References

(

1916 births
2011 deaths
American aerospace engineers
California Institute of Technology alumni
Rensselaer Polytechnic Institute alumni
American people of Swiss descent